Just Sex is a 2005 Hungarian comedy film Directed by Krisztina Goda.

Cast 
 Judit Schell - Dóra
 Kata Dobó - Zsófi
 Sándor Csányi - Tamás
 Károly Gesztesi - Paskó
 Adél Jordán - Saci
 Zoltán Seress - Péter
 Zoltán Rátóti - András

External links

2005 comedy films
2005 films
Hungarian comedy films
Films directed by Krisztina Goda
2000s Hungarian-language films